Aoluguya Evenk Ethnic Township is an ethnic township under the administration of the county-level city of Genhe, Hulunbuir, Inner Mongolia, China.

Toponymy 
Aoluguya is Evenk for "place where the poplars flourish".

History 
In the mid-17th century, ethnic Evenk reindeer herders first migrated to the Argun River basin, where the township is located.

References

Township-level divisions of Inner Mongolia
Genhe
Ethnic townships of the People's Republic of China